Cascade County (cascade means waterfall in French) is a county located in the U.S. state of Montana. As of the 2020 census, the population was 84,414, making it the fifth-most populous county in Montana. Its county seat is Great Falls.

Cascade County comprises the Great Falls, MT Metropolitan Statistical Area.

History
At the time of the Lewis and Clark Expedition, Cascade County was the territory of the Blackfeet. The county was named for the falls on the Missouri River.

The United States Army at one time had Fort Shaw as an outpost in the northwest part of the county. Only a small settlement is left by that name, a CDP.

Geography
The Missouri River and the Sun River flow through the county, and meet at the city of Great Falls. A portion of the Adel Mountains Volcanic Field is in the southwest corner of the county. The Rocky Mountains are in the western part of the county with the Little Belt and Highwood Mountains in the southeast.

Adjacent counties

 Teton County - northwest
 Chouteau County - northeast
 Judith Basin County - east
 Meagher County - south
 Lewis and Clark County - west

National protected areas
 Benton Lake National Wildlife Refuge
 Lewis and Clark National Forest (part)

Politics
Like Lewis & Clark County to the west, Cascade County leans Republican but has voted for Democrats four times since Lyndon Johnson's landslide in 1964. Hubert Humphrey easily won this county in 1968, one of nine counties that he was able to win. Barack Obama carried Cascade in 2008 but lost to Mitt Romney in 2012 by 9%. Since 2012, the county has voted Republican by comfortable margins. In 2020, Donald Trump won the county with over 58% of the vote, the best performance by a Republican since 1920.

In statewide races, Cascade County often acts as a bellwether county and has been friendlier to Democrats - Senators Max Baucus and Jon Tester have carried the county in all of their elections and Governors Brian Schweitzer and Steve Bullock carried it in all four elections in 2004–2016. Since at least 1984, no Democrat has won in Montana without winning Cascade County, however, Republicans have occasionally won statewide without carrying the county, such as former Senator Conrad Burns in 1988 and 2000, Governors Marc Racicot in 1992 and Judy Martz in 2000, Secretaries of State Bob Brown in 2000 and Brad Johnson in 2004, and Attorney General Tim Fox in 2012.

Demographics

2000 census
As of the 2000 United States census, there were 80,357 people, 33,809 households, and 21,403 families living in the county. The population density was 12/km2 (30/sq mi). There were 37,276 housing units at an average density of 5/km2 (13/sq mi).

The racial makeup of the county was 90.72% (72,897) White, 1.1% (900) Black or African American, 4.2% (3,394) Native American, 0.8% (652) Asian, 0.08% (67) Pacific Islander, 0.7% (547) from other races, and 2.4% (1,900) from two or more races; the Asian population doubles when taking two or more races into consideration. 2.4% (1,949) of the population were Hispanic or Latino of any race. 22.5% were of German, 11.1% Irish, 10.2% Norwegian, 8.8% English and 7.7% American ancestry. 95.4% spoke English, 1.7% Spanish and 1.1% German as their first language.

There were 32,547 households, out of which 32.20% had children under the age of 18 living with them, 52.30% were married couples living together, 9.90% had a female householder with no husband present, and 34.10% were non-families. 28.80% of all households were made up of individuals, and 10.90% had someone living alone who was 65 years of age or older. The average household size was 2.41 and the average family size was 2.97.

The county population contained 26.00% under the age of 18, 9.10% from 18 to 24, 28.10% from 25 to 44, 22.80% from 45 to 64, and 14.00% who were 65 years of age or older. The median age was 37 years. For every 100 females there were 97.90 males. For every 100 females age 18 and over, there were 95.70 males.

The median income for a household in the county was $32,971, and the median income for a family was $39,949. Males had a median income of $28,993 versus $20,970 for females. The per capita income for the county was $17,566. About 10.40% of families and 13.50% of the population were below the poverty line, including 18.60% of those under age 18 and 8.40% of those age 65 or over.

2010 census
As of the 2010 United States census, there were 81,327 people, 33,809 households, and 21,403 families living in the county. The racial makeup of the county was 89.2% white, 4.3% American Indian, 1.2% black or African American, 0.8% Asian, 0.1% Pacific islander, 0.6% from other races, and 3.6% from two or more races. Those of Hispanic or Latino origin made up 3.3% of the population. In terms of ancestry, 28.5% were German, 17.1% were Irish, 12.3% were English, 10.3% were Norwegian, and 4.5% were American.

Of the 33,809 households, 29.8% had children under the age of 18 living with them, 48.4% were married couples living together, 10.2% had a female householder with no husband present, 36.7% were non-families, and 30.5% of all households were made up of individuals. The average household size was 2.33 and the average family size was 2.90. The median age was 38.9 years.

The median income for a household in the county was $42,389 and the median income for a family was $53,540. Males had a median income of $37,904 versus $27,944 for females. The per capita income for the county was $22,963. About 10.9% of families and 13.5% of the population were below the poverty line, including 20.4% of those under age 18 and 8.8% of those age 65 or over.

Economy
Malmstrom Air Force Base is a driving force in the regional economy.  In 2009, Benefis, Great Falls Clinic, National Electronics Warranty and Walmart were the largest private employers.

Education
Apollos University, The University of Great Falls, and the MSU College of Technology - Great Falls are both located in Great Falls.

K-12 education
Public school districts include:

Secondary:
 Belt High School District
 Cascade High School District
 Great Falls High School District
 Simms High School District
 Centerville High School District

Elementary:
 Belt Elementary School District
 Centerville Elementary School District
 Cascade Elementary School District
 Great Falls Elementary School District
 Sun River Valley Elementary School District
 Ulm Elementary School District
 Vaughn Elementary School District

There is also a state-operated school, Montana School for the Deaf & Blind.

Communities

City
 Great Falls (county seat)

Towns
 Belt
 Cascade
 Neihart

Census-designated places

 Big Stone Colony
 Black Eagle
 Cascade Colony
 Centerville
 Fair Haven Colony
 Fort Shaw
 Gibson Flats
 Hardy
 Malmstrom AFB
 Monarch
 Pleasant Valley Colony
 Riceville
 Sand Coulee
 Simms
 Stockett
 Sun Prairie
 Sun River
 Tracy
 Ulm
 Vaughn

Unincorporated communities

 Adel
 Armington
 Armington Junction
 Ashuelot
 Dearborn (partially within Lewis & Clark County)
 Eden
 Emerson Junction
 Gordon
 Millegan
 Number Seven
 Salem
 Sheffels
 Portage

In popular culture
Several motion pictures have been filmed in Great Falls. Many have filmed in both Cascade County and Great Falls, and a few in just Cascade County (outside the Great Falls city limits). Those films shot in the county and outside Great Falls city limits include:

 Thunderbolt and Lightfoot (1974)
 The Stone Boy (1984)
 The Untouchables (1987)
 Holy Matrimony (1994)
 The Slaughter Rule (2002)
 Northfork (2003)
 Iron Ridge (2008)
 Wildlife (2018)

See also
 List of lakes in Cascade County, Montana
 List of mountains in Cascade County, Montana
 National Register of Historic Places listings in Cascade County, Montana

References
Notes

Citations

Bibliography

External links
 Cascade County official website

 
Montana counties on the Missouri River
1887 establishments in Montana Territory
Populated places established in 1887